Dragon Ball Z: Sagas is an action-adventure beat 'em up video game developed by Avalanche Software and published by Atari. It is based on the anime Dragon Ball Z.

Gameplay 
Sagas is a linear combat-focused game with new abilities becoming available via upgrade. There are three basic fighting styles: Melee, Combo, and Ki. Melee attacks are often swift and leave the opponent temporarily stunned. Combo attacks are several consecutive punches or kicks to the opponent which may contain up to 10 hits. Ki attacks are energy blasts that rely on a rechargeable meter for power. The most powerful Ki blast is the "Special Move" found in the first level. Each character has their own special Ki blast, but they all have very similar properties.

Reception 

Dragon Ball Z: Sagas received generally mixed to negative reviews from critics and was a commercial failure. GameRankings and Metacritic gave it a score of 52% and 51 out of 100 for the Xbox version; 52% and 48 out of 100 for the GameCube version; and 49% and 49 out of 100 for the PlayStation 2 version. IGN gave the game 4 out of 10, claiming that, "In the end, Dragon Ball Z: Sagas fails in all departments. It's nowhere near as fun or functional as the Budokai games, and completely fails in taking the series into a new direction." The reviews were mainly a result of a lack of gameplay. IGN also claims that "The lack of characters, sagas, and moves is what brings the game down. There is no reason why the very great Dragon Ball Z franchise should be taking a step backwards."

References

External links 
 

2005 video games
Atari games
Sagas
English-language-only video games
GameCube games
PlayStation 2 games
Xbox games
North America-exclusive video games
Toei Animation video game projects
Beat 'em ups
Video games developed in the United States